Bryn Christopher (born 8 November 1985) is a British singer and songwriter. Born in Great Barr, Birmingham, England, he attended the Italia Conti Stage School and was a contestant on Popstars: The Rivals. His debut single, "The Quest", was featured in the TV series Grey's Anatomy.

Musical career

Early years 

Christopher was the support slot on the Amy Winehouse tour at the end of 2007, while he was still relatively unknown (he also supported U.S. soul artist Rahsaan Patterson at London's Jazz Café). He has been picked up by the U.S. agency William Morris Agency. He also co-wrote the Leon Jackson hit song "Don't Call This Love" with British producer/writer Chris Braide. Christopher was also the opening act for Mary J. Blige on her European tour 'Growing Pains' in 2008.

"The Quest" 
Christopher's first single release, "The Quest", was released on 8 June 2008 through Polydor Records. The single draws on his brother's personal experience as a soldier stationed in Basra. His brother two years later would be injured in Afghanistan losing both of his legs. "The Quest" was featured in the closing scene of Grey's Anatomy season 4 conclusion, which caused the song to become more known in the US. The song was made into a music video for the show to promote its fifth season, with scenes of Christopher singing in London as well as scenes from the show. The song was also featured in an episode of the BBC school-based drama Waterloo Road.

It was also covered by Grigory Leps in Russian which became a popular version.

Christopher teamed up with co-writer/producer Jarrad Rogers and production team Midi Mafia to produce his debut album My World, which was released September 2008. Midi Mafia secured the exclusive rights to use samples from the Stax Records Catalogue, and has used some of these for the first time ever on Christopher's album.

His second single, "Smilin" was released on 2 September 2008. It peaked at No. 31. His third single "Fearless" was released on 18 January 2009 and failed to chart. His final single was "Taken Me Over", released on 4 August 2009 as a digital-only single. It also failed to chart.

Christopher then left Polydor, and signed with Geffen Records UK.

Festival appearances 
Christopher hosted a residency at North London's live spot The Boogaloo throughout April 2007, and followed this with dates at London's Soho Revue Bar. He has also played at 2008's Wireless Festival in Hyde Park on the same day as Jay-Z, as well as Glastonbury, T in the Park, Oxegen and V Festival. Christopher has also appeared at the Capital Summertime and Jingle Bell Ball's as the vocalist of Sigala's "Sweet Lovin'"; he also has appeared at V Festival and appeared in many other places during 2015–2017.

2010–present 
Christopher co-wrote the Sub Focus song "Out the Blue", which was released 27 April 2012. He co-wrote and provided uncredited vocals for "Superstar" by Knife Party, from their debut album Abandon Ship (2014). In 2015, he was a featured artist and co-wrote the song "City Lights" by Culture Shock. He also worked with Sigala on the track "Sweet Lovin'", a tropical house track that has over 245 million hits on YouTube (as of October 2021) and reached number three on the UK Singles Chart. He also wrote "Came Here for Love" by Sigala and Ella Eyre with White N3rd and Klingande, which reached number 6 on the UK Singles Chart and was the official London gay pride theme.

I See Monstas

In 2012, Christopher, under the pseudonym Skaar, joined producers Rocky and Rufio to form an electronic music group called MONSTA (subsequently renamed I See Monstas in 2013). The group charted at No. 48 in the UK with their first single "Holdin' On".

Personal life
Christopher is gay. In an interview with Gay Times in October 2018, he revealed he had not come out to his family and dismissed the idea of doing so until he was in a relationship.

Discography

Studio albums

Singles

As lead artist

As featured artist

Promotional singles

Notes
A ^ "Taken Me Over" was released as a digital download single.

Other appearances

Songwriting credits

References

External links

 
 Geffen Records website
 Bryn Christopher interview by Pete Lewis, 'Blues & Soul' September 2008
 Bryn Christopher French Site

1985 births
21st-century Black British male singers
Alumni of the Italia Conti Academy of Theatre Arts
British contemporary R&B singers
English people of Barbadian descent
English soul singers
English tenors
English gay musicians
Geffen Records artists
Gay singers
Gay songwriters
Living people
LGBT Black British people
English LGBT singers
English LGBT songwriters
Musicians from Birmingham, West Midlands
People from Great Barr
Polydor Records artists
Popstars contestants
20th-century English LGBT people
21st-century English LGBT people